The Best Classics... Ever! is a compilation album released by EMI in late 2005. This compilation contains both short works and excerpts from longer works by renowned classical composers.

Track listing

CD 1 
 Erik Satie – "Gymnopédie No. 1"
 Johann Pachelbel – "Canon in D"
 Johann Sebastian Bach – "Air" (on the G string)
 Wolfgang Amadeus Mozart – "Lacrimosa" (Requiem in D minor K. 626)
 Sergei Rachmaninoff – "Piano Concerto No. 2 in C minor, part II: Adagio sostenuto" (opening)
 Antonio Vivaldi – "Winter (The Four Seasons), part II: Largo"
 Michael Nyman – "The Heart Asks Pleasure First"/"The Promise" (The Piano)
 Tomaso Albinoni – "Adagio in G minor (realised Giazotto)" (extract)
 Gabriel Fauré – "Pavane" (arr. Craig Leon)
 Edward Elgar – "Cello Concerto in E minor, Op. 85, part I: Adagio – Moderato" (opening)
 Pyotr Ilyich Tchaikovsky – "Swan Theme" (Swan Lake, Act II – No. 10 Scene)
 Gustav Mahler – "Symphony No. 5 in C-sharp minor, part IV: Adagietto" (conclusion)
 Ludwig van Beethoven – "Moonlight Sonata, part II: Adagio sostenuto" (extract)
 Samuel Barber – "Adagio for Strings"
 Karl Jenkins – "Agnus Dei" (The Armed Man: A Mass for Peace)
 Gregorio Allegri – "Miserere mei, Deus" (vv.1-4 & 17-20)
 Johannes Brahms – "Waltz No. 15 in A-flat"

CD 2 
 Wolfgang Amadeus Mozart – "Eine kleine Nachtmusik, part I: Allegro"
 Johann Strauss II – "On The Beautiful Blue Danube: Waltz, Op. 314" (extract)
 Giuseppe Verdi – "La donna è mobile" (Rigoletto)
 Antonio Vivaldi – "Concerto "L'estate", RV 315, part III: Presto"
 Georges Bizet – "Prelude" (Carmen)
 Maurice Ravel – "Boléro" (conclusion)
 Giacomo Puccini – "Nessun dorma" (Turandot, Act III)
 Léo Delibes – "Dôme épais" (Lakmé, Act I)
 Pyotr Ilyich Tchaikovsky – Piano Concerto No. 1 in B-flat minor, Op. 23, part I: Allegro non troppo e molto maestoso (opening)
 George Gershwin – "Rhapsody in Blue" (jazz band version – opening)
 George Frideric Handel – "Lascia ch'io pianga" (Rinaldo) (arr. Craig Leon and Isobel Cooper)
 Sergei Rachmaninoff – "Rhapsody on a Theme of Paganini" (Op. 43 – Variation 18)
 Vincenzo Bellini – "Casta Diva" (Norma, Act I)
 Wolfgang Amadeus Mozart – "Canzonetta sull'aria" (Le nozze di Figaro, Act III)
 Giacomo Puccini – "O mio babbino caro" (Gianni Schicchi)
 Franz Schubert – "Ave Maria" (Maria Callas)
 John Williams – "Schindler's List Theme"

CD 3 
 Frédéric Chopin – "Mazurkas Op. 59, No. 3 in F sharp minor"
 Nikolai Rimsky-Korsakov – "Flight of the Bumblebee"
 Pyotr Ilyich Tchaikovsky – "Allegro Moderato" (Swan Lake)
 Antonio Vivaldi – "Spring (The Four Seasons), part I: Allegro"
 Johann Sebastian Bach – "Brandenburg Concerto No. 3 in G, BWV 1048, part I: Allegro moderato"
 Wolfgang Amadeus Mozart – "Le nozze di Figaro" (Overture)
 Jacques Offenbach – "Belle nuit, ô nuit d'amour" (Barcarolle) (Les contes d'Hoffmann, Act IV)
 Georges Bizet – "Au fond du temple saint" (Temple Duet) (Les pêcheurs de perles, Act I)
 Gustav Holst – "Jupiter, the Bringer of Jollity" (conclusion) (The Planets)
 George Gershwin – "Summertime" (Porgy and Bess)
 Edvard Grieg – "Piano Concerto in A minor, Op. 16, part I: Allegro molto moderato"
 Giuseppe Verdi – "Va, pensiero" (Chorus of Hebrew Slaves) (Nabucco, Act III)
 Izzy – "Suo Gân"
 George Frideric Handel – "Zadok the Priest – Coronation Anthem"
 Georges Bizet – "L'amour est un oiseau rebelle" (Habanera) (Carmen, Act I)
 Johann Sebastian Bach – "Goldberg Variations Aria"

CD 4 
 Richard Strauss – "Also sprach Zarathustra"
 Sergei Prokofiev – "Montagues and Capulets" (Romeo and Juliet)
 Ludwig van Beethoven – "Symphony No. 5 in C minor"
 Richard Wagner – "Ride of the Valkyries" (Die Walküre)
 Carl Orff – "O Fortuna" (Carmina Burana)
 Antonio Vivaldi – "Concerto 'L'inverno', RV 297"
 Pyotr Tchaikovsky – "Waltz of the Flowers" (The Nutcracker)
 Gioachino Rossini – "Largo al factotum" (Il barbiere di Siviglia)
 Giuseppe Verdi – "La forza del destino" (Overture)
 Charles Gounod – "Valse de Juliette" (Roméo et Juliette)
 Giacomo Puccini – "Un bel dì vedremo" (Madama Butterfly)
 Giuseppe Verdi – "Libiamo ne' lieti calici" (Brindisi) (La traviata)
 Pyotr Tchaikovsky – "1812: Festival Overture, Op. 49"
 Ludwig van Beethoven – "Ode to Joy" (Choral Symphony)
 George Frideric Handel – "Hallelujah Chorus"

Classics
2005 compilation albums
Classical albums